No. 1 of the Secret Service is a 1977 imitation James Bond film starring Nicky Henson as British secret agent Charles Bind. It was directed and written by Lindsay Shonteff and produced by his wife Elizabeth Gray. The film had the working title of 008 of the Secret Service.  It was released on VHS under the title Her Majesty’s Top Gun.

Plot
Eccentric Arthur Loveday decides to do his bit for world peace by having influential financiers assassinated. With regular law enforcement agencies powerless to prevent their deaths, Her Majesty's Government sends in their top agent Charles Bind who is licensed to kill.

Loveday accomplishes his deeds through an organisation of mercenaries named K.R.A.S.H. (Killing Rape Arson Slaughter and Hit). Bind takes them on with his pair of .357 Magnum Smith & Wesson Model 66 revolvers and a .50 calibre M2 Browning machine gun for crowds.

Cast
 Nicky Henson  ...  No. 1 / Charles Bind
 Richard Todd  ...  Arthur Loveday
 Aimi MacDonald  ...  Anna Hudson
 Geoffrey Keen  ...  Rockwell
 Dudley Sutton  ...  K.R.A.S.H. Leader
 Sue Lloyd  ...  Sister Jane
 Jon Pertwee  ...  The Rev. Walter Braithwaite
 Milton Reid  ...  Eye Patch
 Jennifer Baker  ...  Loveday's Girl
 Susan Baker  ...  Loveday's Girl
 Fiona Curzon  ...  Bar Girl
 Jenny Till  ...  Vampire Girl
 Katya Wyeth  ...  Miss Martin
 Oliver MacGreevy ... Simms

Production
In 1965, Canadian director Lindsay Shonteff directed and co-wrote Licensed to Kill, a low budget British made James Bond imitation/parody exploitation film. Produced by James Ward, it starred Tom Adams as Charles Vine imitating Sean Connery as James Bond. With the popularity of the mid-1960s spy movie craze, American producer Joseph E. Levine picked up the film for American and worldwide distribution. He retitled the film The Second Best Secret Agent in the Whole Wide World and added a new title song sung by Sammy Davis Jr.

The international success of the film led to producer Ward and Tom Adams reprising Charles Vine in two sequels; Where the Bullets Fly (1966) directed by John Gilling and presented by Levine and the 1967 made in Spain film Somebody's Stolen Our Russian Spy/O.K. Yevtushenko that languished in a vault until a release in the mid 1970s. Shonteff had nothing to do with those films.

With the continued popularity of the James Bond films starring Roger Moore in the mid 1970s, talk of Sean Connery reprising his 007 role in the planned James Bond of the Secret Service and the delay in the production of Eon Productions’ The Spy Who Loved Me, Shonteff thought he would return to the imitation James Bond field with his own film. The original title of 008 of the Secret Service was replaced by No. 1 of the Secret Service.

Perhaps to avoid rights difficulties with producer James Ward, Shonteff replaced the name of "Charles Vine" with "Charles Bind", that was also the name of one of the characters in Carry On Spying (1964). Bind was played by a fair haired Roger Moore imitator, Nicky Henson. Bind's M type superior Rockwell who was previously played by John Arnatt is now played by Geoffrey Keen who would later make appearances in several Bond films as the Minister of Defence.

With production beginning in October 1976, a sequel was announced during production entitled An Orchid for No. 1.

The sequel was not released until 1979 under the title Licensed to Love and Kill with Gareth Hunt replacing Nicky Henson who had signed with the Royal Shakespeare Company.

Soundtrack
Simon Bell wrote and performed the theme song Givin' It Plenty that was also used in the first sequel Licensed to Love and Kill and reused in Tintorera.

Reception
Alan Burton in Historical Dictionary of British Spy Fiction, which cites that "the cycle of spy films began to lose steam in the 1970s", and mentions No. 1 of the Secret Service and its sequel Licensed to Love and Kill as "the odd picture [that] turned up in the cinema schedules", refers to both films as "crude parodies".

Sequels
 Licensed to Love and Kill (1979) starring Gareth Hunt
 Number One Gun (1980) starring Michael Howe

References

External links
 

1977 films
British parody films
1970s spy comedy films
Parody films based on James Bond films
Films directed by Lindsay Shonteff
British spy films
1970s parody films
1977 comedy films
1970s English-language films